Lotto America is an American multi-state lottery game that began in 2017. It is operated by the Multi-State Lottery Association (MUSL). It takes its name from the original Lotto America, offered from 1988 to 1992. Lotto America was re-launched by 13 state lotteries on November 12, 2017, as a replacement for the scandal-tarred Hot Lotto game; each of the 13 members of Lotto America offered Hot Lotto when it ended on October 28, 2017.

Original Lotto America (1988–1992)
The original version of Lotto America held its first drawing on February 13, 1988. The game was a $1-per-play, pick-7-of-40 game, rather than the pick-6 games that had become wildly popular in U.S. lotteries. Matching four numbers won a fixed prize of $5; matching at least five won a parimutuel prize. Matching all seven won the jackpot, whose odds were roughly 1 in 18 million, at the time the longest odds of a U.S. lottery game. The top prize was a 20-year annuity; there was never a cash option, even though a few games did offer one when Lotto America ended.

During the middle of its four-year run, Lotto America became a more traditional pick-6-of-54 game; unlike the first version, players got two games for $1. The jackpot odds actually became more favorable at 1 in 13 million per dollar; however, overall odds were much tougher, since four numbers were still needed to win the lowest prize tier. This version was entirely parimutuel.

In some of its jurisdictions, Lotto America was known by a different, "more local" name. For instance, in Minnesota, it was called Lotto Minnesota.

Several states joined the Multi-State Lottery Association during the era of Lotto America. One of them, Maine, decided to leave the Multi-State Lottery Association when Lotto America ended; Maine did not rejoin the Multi-State Lottery Association until 2004.

The Multi-State Lottery Associations' rapidly growing population base resulted in the replacement of Lotto America in April 1992 with Powerball.

Original members (1988–1992)

§ One of the founding members of the Multi-State Lottery Association composed the original lineup for Lotto America.

2017 revival
Due to falling sales of Hot Lotto in the wake of the Hot Lotto fraud scandal, the game was discontinued and the final drawing was held on October 28, 2017. As a replacement, a new version of Lotto America became available on November 12, 2017; its first drawing was November 15, 2017. Lotto America is available wherever Hot Lotto was offered at the time of its final drawing, except New Hampshire. Lotto America is drawn on Monday, Wednesday and Saturday nights after 11 p.m. ET/10 p.m. CT. 
For each $1 play, bettors choose five numbers from 1 through 52, and a "star ball" numbered from 1 through 10, or ask for terminal-generated numbers. For an additional $1 per play, the bettor can add the "All-Star Bonus" option, which multiplies non-jackpot prizes by 2, 3, 4, or 5. The minimum Lotto America jackpot is $2 million; however, the game's initial jackpot was $15 million; the 13 members chose to augment the jackpot with funds from Hot Lotto, whose final jackpot was not won.

While Hot Lotto used a random number generator during most of its run (including the December 2010 drawing whose jackpot was "won" by Eddie Tipton, a MUSL employee), Lotto America is believed to be drawn in Tallahassee, Florida (even though the Florida Lottery does not offer the game), using physical ball machines and numbered balls; one machine draws the five main numbers while another is used to draw the "Star Ball". As of December 2018, none of the actual drawings have been made available to the viewing public; a computer-generated display of the drawings is shown on an unofficial website.

Members
Delaware
Idaho
Iowa
Kansas
Maine
Minnesota
Montana
New Mexico
North Dakota
Oklahoma
South Dakota
Tennessee
West Virginia
Note: these 13 members were among Hot Lotto's membership when it ended on October 28, 2017. New Hampshire, the other Hot Lotto member when the game ended, has put off plans to join Lotto America.

References

Lottery games in the United States